Meeker Slough is a creek in Richmond, California, that drains from the flatlands of the Marina Bay neighborhood. It empties into Meeker Slough, a marsh of the same name which empties into Campus Bay in the Richmond Inner Harbor. Meeker Slough is a very short creek that drains from a very flat area and has a very small watershed in comparison to neighboring Baxter Creek, San Pablo Creek and Castro Creeks.

Rivers of Contra Costa County, California
Bodies of water of Richmond, California
Rivers of Northern California
Tributaries of San Francisco Bay